Patterson Ridge is a ridge located in Greene County, New York east-southeast of Prattsville, New York. Bald Mountain is located along Patterson Ridge. It drains south into Schoharie Creek and north into Batavia Kill.

References

Mountains of Greene County, New York
Mountains of New York (state)